Shan Foods (Pvt) Limited is a Pakistani producer of packaged spice mixes, primarily used in South Asian dishes. The company was established in 1981 as a single-room operation by its founder, Sikander Sultan, in Pakistan and quickly grew from there to becoming a major player in the packaged spice mixes industry.

Currently, the company portfolio of products is available in over 75 countries, across 5 continents, and consists of recipe mixes, plain spices, ready-to-cook sauces, cooking pastes, dessert mixes, cooking condiments, and accompaniments as well as instant noodles.

The company also has a research and development department that is responsible for developing new products and improving existing ones.

History
Shan Foods (Pvt) Limited started off in 1981, as a cottage industry operation, operating out of the home of the company's founder Sikander Sultan. He, along with his wife, started making spice mixes at their home, experimenting extensively to come up with unique offerings, which instantly picked up a loyal fan base both, at home and with South Asians who had moved to Western Countries, such as USA and Canada.

Today, Shan Foods is one of Pakistan's largest manufacturers and exporters, and their offered range is considered synonymous with the traditional authentic taste of the subcontinent coupled with convenience and ease.

References

External links
Shan Foods official website

Brand name condiments
Food manufacturers of Pakistan
Pakistani brands
1981 establishments in Pakistan
Food and drink companies based in Karachi
Manufacturing companies based in Karachi
Privately held companies of Pakistan